Sellar is a surname, and may refer to:

 Alexander Craig Sellar (1835 – 1890), Scottish lawyer and Liberal politician
 David Sellar (1941 – 2019), Scottish solicitor and officer of arms
 George Sellar (1850 – 1889), Scottish recipient of the Victoria Cross
 Irvine Sellar (1934 – 2017), British property developer
 James Sellar (disambiguation)
 JoAnne Sellar (born 1963), English-American film producer
 Kenneth Sellar (1906 – 1989), English sportsman 
 Patrick Sellar (1780 – 1851), factor to Duke of Sutherland. Widely believed to have committed culpable homicide during an eviction. 
 W. C. Sellar (1898 – 1951), Scottish humourist 
 William Sellar (1866 – 1914), Scottish footballer
 William Young Sellar (1825 – 1890), Scottish classical scholar

See also
 Sellars, a surname
 Seller (surname)
 Cellar (disambiguation), a storage area, or rooms below ground level

Scottish surnames